This is a list of members of the New South Wales Legislative Assembly  who served in the 16th parliament of New South Wales from 1894 to 1895 They were elected at the 1894 colonial election on 17 July 1894. The Speaker was Sir Joseph Palmer Abbott.

By-elections

Under the constitution, ministers were required to resign to recontest their seats in a by-election when appointed. These by-elections are only noted when the minister was defeated; in general, he was elected unopposed.

See also
Reid ministry
Results of the 1894 New South Wales colonial election
 Candidates of the 1894 New South Wales colonial election

Notes

References

Members of New South Wales parliaments by term
19th-century Australian politicians